Mary Catherine "Molly" Phee (born 1963) is an American diplomat who has served as Assistant Secretary of State for African Affairs since September 2021. She previously served as the U.S. Ambassador to South Sudan from 2015 to 2017. She is a career member of the Senior Foreign Service with the rank of Minister Counselor.

Early life and education

Phee is from Chicago. She was an undergraduate at Indiana University, where she earned a B.A. She pursued graduate studies at the Fletcher School of Law and Diplomacy at Tufts University, earning an M.A. in Law and Diplomacy in 1989. As part of her graduate studies, she participated in an internship program with the United Nations Environment Programme that involved travel and study in Kenya.

Career

Following her graduate studies, Phee became a deputy press secretary to Senator Daniel Patrick Moynihan.

Phee joined the U.S. Foreign Service in 1991. Her assignments in the Foreign Service have included ones in Rome, Italy; Kuwait City, Kuwait; Cairo, Egypt; Amman, Jordan; and Washington, DC.

From 2003 to 2004, Phee served as the Senior Civilian Representative of the Coalition Provisional Authority to Maysan Province, Iraq 

In 2005, Phee moved to New York to serve as Counselor for Political Affairs and Deputy Security Council Coordinator at the U.S. Mission to the United Nations, where on occasion sat in for then-Ambassador John R. Bolton. Ambassador Ryan Crocker and General David Petraeus invited Phee to join the Joint Strategic Assessment Team established in 2007 to revise the U.S. strategy in Iraq.

In 2008, Phee took an assignment in Italy as the regional affairs coordinator at the U.S. Embassy in Rome.

From 2009 to 2011, Phee returned to Washington to serve as director for Iraq at the National Security Council. In that role she was responsible for coordinating the U.S. transition from military to civilian operations, culminating in the withdrawal of U.S. combat troops in December 2011.

From 2011 to 2014, Phee served as Deputy Chief of Mission at the U.S. Embassy in Addis Ababa, Ethiopia. When President Obama nominated her to become Ambassador to South Sudan, she was already serving as Chief of Staff at the Office of the Special Envoy for Sudan and South Sudan.

Ambassador to South Sudan
On September 17, 2014, Phee was nominated to be U.S. Ambassador to South Sudan by President Barack Obama. She was confirmed by the Senate on June 24, 2015, and sworn in on July 15, 2015, to replace Susan D. Page, who had resigned. She served from 2015 until 2017.

When the Senate Foreign Relations Committee did not immediately confirm Phee's nomination, several NGOs wrote to the committee urging it to quickly confirm the nomination, given the difficult situation in South Sudan. The organizations included Better World Campaign, The Enough Project, Humanity United, Jewish World Watch, International Rescue Committee, Mercy Corps, Oxfam America, Relief International, Save the Children, United to End Genocide, and Water for South Sudan. The NGOs protested that the U.S. had been without a confirmed Ambassador to South Sudan since August 2014. They noted that the absence of an ambassador in a country involved in a "deadly, costly and geopolitically destabilizing civil war" had limited the U.S. ability to successfully promote peaceful resolution.

In accepting the role of Ambassador in 2015, Phee was expected to oversee the relief effort of $456 million donated by the U.S. for over a million people displaced by the war, as well as revive the peace talks in Addis Ababa.

Ambassador Phee was then named as Principal Deputy Assistant Secretary of the Bureau of International Organization Affairs and served as Acting Assistant Secretary until the appointment of Kevin Moley. Her assignment was curtailed by Moley, after which the U.S. Department of State Office of the Inspector General opened an investigation into allegations that the Assistant Secretary and other political appointees in the Bureau of International Organization Affairs used politicized and improper practices against career employees. Ambassador Phee then served as the Deputy Special Representative for Afghanistan Reconciliation.

Biden administration

State Department Nomination
On April 15, 2021, President Joe Biden nominated Phee to be the next Assistant Secretary of State for African Affairs. The Senate Foreign Relations Committee held hearings on her nomination on July 20, 2021. The committee favorably reported her nomination to the Senate floor on August 4, 2021. On September 28, 2021, the U.S. Senate confirmed Phee as Assistant Secretary by a vote of 67-31. She was sworn in on September 30.

Tenure
On January 14, 2022, Phee announced that she will seek to help end the ongoing conflicts in Ethiopia with a visit to Saudi Arabia, Sudan and Ethiopia.

African Development Foundation Nomination
Along with being nominated for a role in the State Department, Phee was nominated by President Biden to be a member of the Board of Directors of the African Development Foundation. Hearings were held on this nomination by the Senate Foreign Relations Committee on July 20, 2021. The committee favorably reported the nomination to the Senate floor on August 4, 2021. One of these nominations was withdrawn by President Biden on February 10, 2022, as the term for it had expired. Phee's nomination for a term expiring in 2026 is pending before the entire Senate.

Personal
In addition to English, Phee speaks Arabic, French and Italian.

References

1963 births
Living people
Ambassadors of the United States to South Sudan
American women ambassadors
Indiana University alumni
Obama administration personnel
Biden administration personnel
People from Chicago
The Fletcher School at Tufts University alumni
United States Foreign Service personnel
Assistant Secretaries of State for African Affairs
21st-century American women
21st-century American diplomats
American women diplomats